Ustad  Amjad Ali Khan (born 9 October 1945) is an Indian classical sarod player, best known for his clear and fast ekhara taans. Khan was born into a classical musical family and has performed internationally since the 1960s. He was awarded India's second highest civilian honor Padma Vibhushan in 2001. India's Third highest  civilian honor Padma Bhushan in 1991 and Padma Shree in 1975.

Career and recognition

Khan first performed in the United States in 1963 and continued into the 2000s, with his sons. He has experimented with modifications to his instrument throughout his career. Khan played with the Hong Kong Philharmonic Orchestra and worked as a visiting professor at the University of New Mexico. In 2011, he performed on Carrie Newcomer's album Everything is Everywhere. In 2014, along with his two sons, Ayaan Ali Khan and Amaan Ali Khan, he performed 'Raga For Peace' in 2014 Nobel Peace Prize Concert.

Khan was awarded 21st Rajiv Gandhi National Sadbhavna Award. Khan received Padma Shri in 1975, Padma Bhushan in 1991, and Padma Vibhushan in 2001, and was awarded the Sangeet Natak Akademi Award for 1989 and the Sangeet Natak Akademi Fellowship for 2011. He was awarded the Fukuoka Asian Culture Prize in 2004. The U.S. state Massachusetts proclaimed 20 April as Amjad Ali Khan Day in 1984. Khan was made an honorary citizen of Houston, Texas, and Nashville, Tennessee, in 1997, and of Tulsa, Oklahoma, in 2007. He received the Banga-Vibhushan in 2011.

Ustad Amjad Ali Khan (1990), a Gulzar directed Indian documentary film on Amjad Ali Khan won the Filmfare Award for Best Documentary in 1990.

Personal life

Born on 9 October 1945 as Masoom Ali Khan, the youngest of seven children, to Gwalior court musician Hafiz Ali Khan and Rahat Jahan. His family is part of the Bangash lineage and Khan is in the sixth generation of musicians; his family claims to have invented the sarod. His personal name was changed by a sadhu to Amjad. Khan received homeschooling and studied music under his father. In 1957, a cultural organization in Delhi appointed Hafiz Ali Khan as its guest and the family moved to Delhi. Hafiz Ali Khan received training from the descendants of Tansen, the magical musician, was one of the 'Nav-ratna' ( nine gems) at the court of the Mughal Emperor Akbar. Thus, Amjad belongs to the lineage of Tansen. Friends of Hafiz Ali Khan convinced him of the importance of formal schooling for his son; as a result, Amjad was taken to meet the Principal of Modern School in New Delhi and admitted there as a day scholar.  He attended Modern School from 1958 to 1963.

On 25 September 1976, Khan got married a second time. His bride was Bharatanatyam dancer Subhalakshmi Barooah, hailing from Assam in north-eastern India. They have two sons, Amaan and Ayaan, both of whom are performing artists trained in music by their father.

Khan cared for his diabetic father until he died in 1972. Their family home in Gwalior was made into a musical center and they live in New Delhi.

Discography
 The Maestro's Musings (LP) (1986, CBS)
 Swar Sameer (1991, Super Cassettes Industries Ltd., T-Series)
 Serene Strings (1994, EMI, RPG Enterprises)
 North India: Instrumental Music of Medieval India (1994, Ocora)
 Ragas Bilaskhani Todi & Brindabani Sarang (1994, Navras Records)
 The Rough Guide to the Music of India and Pakistan (1996, World Music Network) (contributing artist)
 Sarod Maestro Amjad Ali Khan with sons Amaan Ali Bangash & Ayaan Ali Bangash (2001, Chhanda Dhara)
 Music from the 13th Century (2005, Navras Records)
 Moksha (2005, Real World Records)
 Confluence (2005, Navras Records) (jugalbandi with singer Girija Devi)
 My Inspirations (2006, Navras Records)
 Romancing The Rains (2007, Navras Records)
 Samaagam (2011, World Village) (with the Scottish Chamber Orchestra)
 Masterworks From The NCPA Archives (2012, Navras Records)
 Raga Bahar (2015, Sony music)

References

External links

1945 births
Commandeurs of the Ordre des Arts et des Lettres
Hindustani instrumentalists
Indian Muslims
Living people
People from Gwalior
Recipients of the Padma Bhushan in arts
Recipients of the Padma Shri in arts
Indian people of Pashtun descent
Recipients of the Padma Vibhushan in arts
Recipients of the Sangeet Natak Akademi Award
Recipients of the Sangeet Natak Akademi Fellowship
Sarod players
Modern School (New Delhi) alumni